Larbi Ihardane (born 6 June 1954) is a Moroccan footballer. He competed in the men's tournament at the 1972 Summer Olympics.

References

External links
 

1954 births
Living people
Moroccan footballers
Footballers from Casablanca
Morocco international footballers
Olympic footballers of Morocco
Footballers at the 1972 Summer Olympics
1972 African Cup of Nations players
1976 African Cup of Nations players
1978 African Cup of Nations players
Africa Cup of Nations-winning players
Botola players
Wydad AC players
Association football defenders